The Federal Motor Carrier Safety Administration (FMCSA) is an agency in the United States Department of Transportation that regulates the trucking industry in the United States. The primary mission of the FMCSA is to reduce crashes, injuries and fatalities involving large trucks and buses.

History 
The agency was established as a separate administration within U.S. Department of Transportation on January 1, 2000, pursuant to the "Motor Carrier Safety Improvement Act of 1999." FMCSA is headquartered in Washington, D.C. and employs more than 1,000 people in all 50 States and the District of Columbia, with the goal of making "roadways safer for the public and the CMV industry".

Main functions
In carrying out its safety mandate to reduce crashes, injuries, and fatalities involving large trucks and buses, FMCSA:

 Develops and enforces data-driven regulations that balance motor carrier (truck and bus companies) safety with efficiency;
 Harnesses safety information systems to focus on higher risk carriers in enforcing the safety regulations;
Provide the information on consumer complaints, authority status, and carrier insurance;
 Targets educational messages to carriers, commercial drivers, and the public; and
 Partners with stakeholders including Federal, State, and local enforcement agencies, the motor carrier industry, safety groups, and organized labor on efforts to reduce bus and truck-related crashes.

Leadership 
Raymond P. Martinez was sworn in as Administrator of the FMCSA on February 28, 2018. Previously, Martinez served as Chairman and Chief Administrator of the New Jersey Motor Vehicle Commission. He left office on October 31, 2019, and the post has been without a permanent occupant ever since.

Cathy F. Gautreaux became the Agency’s Deputy Administrator in November 2017 after serving as the Executive Director of the Louisiana Motor Transportation Association for 29 years. She left office on January 20, 2021.

Meera Joshi served as Acting Administrator of the FMCSA from January 20, 2021 prior to her appointment as Deputy Mayor for Operations of New York City in January, 2022.

List of Administrators

Organization
The FMCSA is divided into 8 offices:

 Office of the Administrator: MC-A
 Office of Administration: MC-M
 Office of Chief Counsel: MC-C
 Office of Chief Financial Officer: MC-B
 Office of Enforcement: MC-E
 Office of Policy: MC-P
 Office of Research and Information Technology: MC-R
 Field Operations: MC-F

Field offices
The field organizations deliver program services to FMCSA partners and customers. This organization consists of Field Operations, Service center and State-level motor carrier division offices.

These offices answer questions and provide guidance concerning the Federal Motor Carrier Safety Regulations.
 List of FMCSA Service Centers
 List of FMCSA Field Offices

Main programs

Compliance, Safety, Accountability (CSA)
Compliance, Safety, Accountability (CSA) is described by FMCSA as its "data-driven safety compliance and enforcement program designed to improve safety and prevent commercial motor vehicle crashes, injuries, and fatalities". This program oversees carriers’ safety performance through roadside inspections and crash investigations, issuing violations when instances of noncompliance with safety regulations are uncovered. The Agency’s safety investigation team and state law enforcement partners are small compared to the millions of CMV companies and commercial driver license (CDL) holders nationwide. A key component of the CSA program – known as the Safety Measurement System (SMS) – relies on data analysis to identify non-compliant and unsafe companies to prioritize them for enforcement interventions.

While the methodology for calculating SMS safety scores has evolved over time in response to suggestions from stakeholders, the program has proven effective at identifying unsafe, high-risk carriers. FMCSA is expected to publicly release additional changes to SMS designed to strengthen the Agency’s ability to identify companies for investigation before they are involved in a crash. The program's future remains in doubt as it has been the subject of heavy criticism from the DOT's own Inspector General, the Government Accountability Office, and Congress itself in the FAST Act. That Act requires the National Research Council of the National Academies of Science (NAS) to conduct a thorough study of the Compliance, Safety, Accountability (CSA) program, specifically the Safety Measurement System (SMS).

Hours of Service (HOS) and Driver Restart Study
In July 2013, FMCSA updated HOS regulation to help reduce the incidence of CMV driver fatigue on the nation’s roadways. The final rule required truck drivers who use the “34-hour restart” provision to maximize their weekly work hours to limit the restart to once a week and to include in the restart period at least two nights off duty from 1:00 to 5:00 a.m., when one’s 24-hour body clock supposedly needs and benefits from sleep the most.

In December 2014, Congress passed the FAST Act, which suspended the new 34-hour restart provision in the HOS rule and instructed FMCSA to study its effectiveness. In 2015, FMCSA selected Virginia Tech Transportation Institute (VTTI) to conduct the largest naturalistic study of its kind that the Agency had ever undertaken. FMCSA anticipated releasing the findings in 2017.

National Registry
Implemented in 2014, the National Registry rule requires all Medical Examiners (ME) who conduct physical examinations and issue medical certifications for interstate CMV drivers to complete training on FMCSA’s physical qualification standards, pass a certification test, and demonstrate competence through periodic training and testing. CMV drivers whose medical certifications expire must use MEs on the National Registry for their examinations.

FMCSA has reached its goal of at least 40,000 certified MEs signing onto the registry, meaning drivers can now find certified medical examiners throughout the country who can competently perform their medical exam. FMCSA is preparing to issue a follow-on “National Registry 2” rulemaking that will require MEs to submit medical certificate information on a daily basis. These daily updates, which FMCSA will transmit to states electronically, will dramatically decrease the chance of drivers falsifying medical cards.

ELDT- Entry Level Driver Trains Program and TPR- Training Provider Registry 

On February 7, 2022, new regulations have been put into place regarding obtaining a commercial driver's license, upgrading an existing CDL license or obtaining a passenger, school bus or hazmat endorsement. The new regulation adjusted the minimum training standards. As of Feb. 7, 2022 training providers will be required to register with the TPR and upload documents to confirm applicants for CDL licenses have met the EDLT minimum standards.

CSA overhaul
In 2015 a Congressional mandate, that was part of the Fixing America’s Surface Transportation Act (FAST Act), directed a full review of the CSA program by the Inspector General of the U.S. Department of Transportation and the National Academy of Sciences (NAS). The review (study) was named the "Correlation Study Corrective Action Plan". The FMCSA had already started implementing changes in the CSA but withdrew these after the study was published.

Fleet mileage will be included in the new plan and the FMCSA will study sharing information with the International Registration Plan (IRP) and International Fuel Tax Agreement (IFTA) organizations with consideration of incentives for voluntary mileage updates. The FMCSA will partner with the National Highway Traffic Safety Administration in getting states to participate in uniform crash reporting standards.

In September 2018 the FMCSA began small-scale testing using an Item Response Theory (IRT) model to replace the Safety Measurement System with plans for full testing in 2019. The FMCSA currently uses percentile comparisons (relative rankings) of similar fleets when computing the "Behavioral Analysis and Safety Improvement Categories" (BASIC) scores but will study if absolute measures of safety should be used instead. The Safety Measurement System (SMS) website was changed in September 2018 with certain previous public information on property carrier’s compliance and safety performance information now withheld. Ten organizations, including the American Trucking Association (ATA), Truckload Carriers Association (TCA), and OOIDA, co-signed a letter to then Department of Transportation Secretary Anthony Foxx, requesting that CSA scores not be available to the public. Industry concerns have long been that the CSA scoring is "highly defective", has inconsistencies with the Safety Measurement System, and has "significant shortcomings".

Concerns
Shippers and brokers have used the CSA scores as a bench-mark to find safe carriers. With this hidden there may be more calls for legislation establishing uniform federal standards for qualifying carriers. House Bill H.R.1568 was introduced, that was referred to the subcommittee of the Subcommittee on Highways and Transit, and Senate Bill S.1345 was introduced, that was read twice and referred to the Committee on Commerce, Science, and Transportation. The insurance industry also used the CSA scores to evaluate the overall fitness and risk profile of carriers and drivers.

The American Transportation Research Institute (ATRI) released a report in 2015 criticizing the CSA scoring, citing that a lack of "crash accountability or crash weighting in CSA has long-plagued the program", negatively affecting scores on crashes that are not the fault of the carrier or driver. The ATRI report found that negative scores resulted from trucks colliding with an animal in the roadway, another driver hitting a legally parked truck, another driver running a red light or stop sign and hitting a truck, another driver being under the influence of drugs or alcohol and hitting a truck, and truck-assisted suicide by a pedestrian and that non-preventable crashes needs to be removed from carriers’ CSA records.

Applicability of FMCSA regulations

All non-exempt commercial motor vehicles that cross state lines, including big-rig trucks, are subject to the federal motor carrier safety regulations. If these semi-trucks are operating within one state, they need to abide by state-equivalent motor carrier safety regulations. The intent of the regulations is to cover all persons and entities involved in operating commercial vehicles, including:
drivers,
hiring managers,
trainers,
supervisors,
managers,
dispatchers,
other people whose action affects drivers and commercial motor vehicles.

The Federal Motor Carrier Safety Regulations (FMCSRs) set forth minimum standards for those involved with the operation of commercial motor vehicles in interstate commerce, in order to cover all people and entities involved in interstate operation of these trucks.

Consumer protection initiatives

"Look Before You Book"
FMCSA's "Look Before You Book" campaign encourages trip planners and passengers to think about more than price and to consider safety first when choosing bus companies and drivers. The program features DOT’s first app – SaferBus – that provides safety data on each bus company under FMCSA’s jurisdiction.  The primary audiences for this campaign are travel planners that serve faith-based organizations, seniors and student groups.

Protect Your Move
Of the estimated 35 million Americans who move each year, about 600,000 hire a company to move their household goods across state lines. FMCSA receives about 3,000 complaints annually about deceptive practices and fraud by dishonest operators.

The Protect Your Move program aims to protect consumers and counter interstate moving fraud in two ways: 1) by educating consumers who are preparing to move to make informed decisions about moving companies and avoid being taken advantage of by a disreputable mover; and 2) by providing tools and information to victims after moving fraud has occurred to help them resolve mover disputes and/or file fraud complaints and seek arbitration or legal action.

FMSCA provides a searchable database for consumers to verify Household Goods Carriers authorization, licensing and insurance under the Protect Your Move Program.

See also
United States Department of Transportation
Motor carrier safety rating
Freight broker bond

References

Sources 

1. Federal Motor Carrier Safety Administration - About Us

2. Federal Motor Carrier Safety Administration - Key Programs

3. Comprehensive Safety Analysis 2010

External links

 Federal Motor Carrier Safety Administration
 Federal Motor Carrier Safety Administration in the Federal Register

Road safety
Trucking industry in the United States
United States Department of Transportation agencies
Government agencies established in 2000
Motor Carrier Safety